The New Guinea blue-eye (Pseudomugil novaeguineae) is a species of fish in the subfamily Pseudomugilinae. It is found in New Guinea and the Aru Islands.

References

Fish of New Guinea
Pseudomugil
Taxa named by Max Carl Wilhelm Weber
Fish described in 1905